Billal Brahimi (born 14 March 2000) is a professional footballer who plays as a forward for Ligue 1 club Nice. Born in France, he plays for the Algeria national team.

Club career

Middlesbrough 
Brahimi is a youth product of Cergy Pontoise, Saint-Ouen-l'Aumône and Leixões. He signed for Middlesbrough from Leixões in 2017. He made his debut for the club on 28 August 2018 in a 2–1 win over Rochdale in the EFL Cup, coming on as a substitute for Muhamed Bešić at the Riverside Stadium.

Reims 
On 25 July 2019, Brahimi moved to Ligue 1 club Reims on a free transfer, with Middlesbrough receiving compensation for the departure. Brahimi cited a desire to move closer to his family in France as the motivation behind the move. In August 2020, he joined Le Mans in the Championnat National on loan for the 2020–21 season.

Angers 
On 8 September 2021, Brahimi signed for Ligue 1 side Angers on a contract until June 2024.

Nice
On 28 January 2022, Brahimi joined Nice for a reported fee of €10 million.

International career
Born in France, Brahimi is of Algerian descent.  He was called up to the Algeria national team in May 2022. He debuted with Algeria in a 2–0 2023 Africa Cup of Nations qualification win over Uganda on 4 June 2022.

Style of play
Brahimi can play anywhere along the forward line, but has appeared most frequently for Middlesbrough's academy sides as a left-winger.

Career statistics

Honours 
Nice
 Coupe de France runner-up: 2021–22

References

External links
 
 
 FFF Profile

2000 births
Living people
People from Beaumont-sur-Oise
Algerian footballers
Algeria international footballers
French footballers
France youth international footballers
French sportspeople of Algerian descent
Footballers from Val-d'Oise
Association football forwards
Ligue 1 players
Championnat National players
Championnat National 2 players
Leixões S.C. players
Middlesbrough F.C. players
Stade de Reims players
Le Mans FC players
Angers SCO players
OGC Nice players
French expatriate footballers
French expatriate sportspeople in England
Expatriate footballers in England